Jo Ann Washam (May 24, 1950 – December 6, 2019) was an American professional golfer who played on the LPGA Tour.

Washam was born in Auburn, Washington. She played college golf and basketball at Washington State University, where she also joined the women's fraternity Alpha Gamma Delta. She was elected to the Washington State University Athletic Hall of Fame in 1982.

Washam won three times on the LPGA Tour between 1975 and 1979.

Washam died on December 6, 2019.

Professional wins

LPGA Tour wins

LPGA Tour playoff record (0–1)

Other wins
1976 Pepsi-Cola Mixed Team Championship (with Chi-Chi Rodríguez)
1979 Portland Ping Team Championship (with Nancy Lopez)

References

External links

American female golfers
LPGA Tour golfers
Golfers from Washington (state)
Washington State Cougars women's basketball players
People from Auburn, Washington
1950 births
2019 deaths